Isle of Wight County Council was the county council of the non-metropolitan English county of the Isle of Wight from 1890 to 1995.

History

County councils were first introduced in England and Wales with full powers from 22 September 1889 as a result of the Local Government Act 1888, taking over administrative functions until then carried out by the unelected Quarter Sessions. The areas they covered were termed administrative counties and were not in all cases identical to the traditional shire counties. 

To begin with, the Isle of Wight was part of the area of Hampshire County Council, but a year later the island was given its own county council, which came into being on 1 April 1890. Following the first elections, Somerset Gough-Calthorpe, 7th Baron Calthorpe was elected as first Chairman. He was succeeded in 1898 by Sir Godfrey Baring, 1st Baronet, who was Chairman for almost sixty years, until his death in 1957.

Premises were acquired, the former Swan Hotel in High Street, Newport, and some houses on either side, and the County Council was based there for several years. A new building, designed in the Neo-Georgian style by Gutteridge and Gutteridge, was built on the same site and opened by Robert Sanders, 1st Baron Bayford, in October 1938. An extension was built on its east side in 1969.

On 1 April 1995, following recommendations made by the Local Government Commission for England appointed in 1992, the county council and the island’s two district councils, Medina and South Wight (which themselves had been created by mergers in 1974) were replaced by a new unitary authority called Isle of Wight Council, the first elections to which were held in 1995.

Responsibilities
The functions coming across to the new county councils from the former quarter sessions were set out in the Act of 1888, and included: repairing county roads and bridges, building and maintaining county buildings, such as county halls, court houses, and police stations, providing asylums for pauper lunatics, maintaining reformatory and industrial schools,
providing polling stations for parliamentary elections, fish conservancy, control of wild birds, destructive insects, and contagious diseases in animals, weights and measures, licensing places of entertainment and race courses, levying rates, borrowing money, and hiring and dismissing county officers.

By the time it was merged into the new Isle of Wight Council unitary authority, the Council provided a wide range of services, including education, libraries, youth services, social services, highway maintenance, waste disposal, emergency planning, consumer protection and town and country planning for matters to do with minerals, waste, highways and education. This made it the largest employer on the island.

Coat of arms

The Coat of arms of the Isle of Wight was first granted to the County Council in 1938. On its abolition in 1995, the right to use them transferred to the new Isle of Wight Council.

The shield shows a simplified figure of Carisbrooke Castle, the historic seat of the island’s royal governors, and the blue field and the anchors represent the sea. Underneath is the island's motto, "All this beauty is of God".

Notable members

Somerset Gough-Calthorpe, 7th Baron Calthorpe (1890–1898, first Chairman)
Sir Godfrey Baring, 1st Baronet (Chairman 1898–1957)
Sir Edgar Chatfeild-Clarke (1900–1925)
Patrick Seely, 3rd Baron Mottistone (1934–1938)
Mark Woodnutt (1950s)
Stephen Ross, Baron Ross of Newport (1967–1974, 1981–1985, Leader in the 1970s)

See also
List of electoral divisions in the Isle of Wight
Isle of Wight Council elections
Wightbus

References

Former county councils of England
1890 establishments in England
1995 disestablishments in England
Local authorities in the Isle of Wight